Burgos Club de Fútbol, S.A.D. is a Spanish football team based in Burgos, in the autonomous community of Castile and León. Founded in 1985, it started to play in 1994. It currently plays in Segunda División, holding home matches at the Estadio El Plantío, with a capacity of 12,646.

History

Early years

Burgos CF was founded in 1922, also known as Gimnástica Burgalesa Club de Fútbol. In 1983, the side disappeared due to serious economic problems and the reserve team, Burgos Promesas, was renamed Real Burgos Club de Fútbol.
 
The side participated three seasons in the national top flight but, shortly after its 1993 relegation, ceased in activity, and Burgos CF was immediately refounded.

1994–present
In 1994, the new Burgos CF started to play in Primera Provincial, sixth tier, with Félix Arnaiz as head coach. Arnaiz would reach the Tercera División after two consecutive promotions. In 1997 the club promoted for the first time to Segunda División B. After a doubtful first year, where the club avoided relegation in the last weeks of the competition, Burgos CF started to qualify to the promotion play-offs to Segunda División. It would be in 2001, in its third try, when the club would reach its target after defeating Sabadell, Ceuta and Ourense in the play-offs.

In the 2001–02 season, with Enrique Martín as head coach, Burgos would finish 16th but they would be relegated to Segunda División B due to the non-conversion of the club into a Sociedad Anónima Deportiva.

After this administrative relegation, Burgos would continue playing in Segunda División B, being very close to promotion in the 2007 play-offs, where they were beaten by Sevilla Atlético in extra time of the last round. One year later, the club would be relegated to Tercera División after failing to beat CF Palencia in the last round. The match finished a draw that relegated both teams.

Burgos would spend three seasons in Tercera División after its promotion in the 2011 play-offs, where they beat UD Lanzarote by 4–0 in the second leg played at El Plantío. The promotion was followed by a disastrous campaign in the 2011–12 Segunda División B where the club finished as last qualified of the Group 1.

Only one year later, Burgos CF promoted again to the third tier by beating CD El Palo 3–2 in the second leg of the 2013 play-offs.

On 19 June 2017, one month after avoiding the relegation to Tercera División by winning Linares Deportivo in the play-offs, the assembly of Burgos CF approved the conversion of the club into Sociedad Anónima Deportiva, 16 years later after the first frustrated attempt. The club would achieve this goal on 6 April 2018.

On 4 June 2019, Burgos CF signed an affiliation agreement with CD Nuestra Señora de Belén, for acting as its women's football section.

In 2020–21, Burgos won their group and gained promotion to the second division, 19 years since their last appearance, after defeating Bilbao Athletic in the promotion play-off finals.

Club background
Burgos Club de Fútbol (I) - (1936–83)
Burgos Club de Fútbol - (1985–present)

Season to season

3 seasons in Segunda División
18 seasons in Segunda División B
5 seasons in Tercera División
2 seasons in Categorías Regionales

Honours
Segunda División B: 2000–01, 2020–21
Tercera División: 1996–97, 2009–10, 2010–11, 2012–13
Copa Federación: 1996–97
Copa Federación (Castile and León tournament): 1996, 1998, 2008, 2012, 2017

Current squad
.

Reserve team

Out on loan

Current staff

Former players

  Daniel Pendín
  Aritz Aduriz
  Juan Epitié
  Dmitri Cheryshev

Presidents
José María Quintano 1994–2002
Valentín Germán 2002–2005
Domingo Novoa 2005–2008
Juan Carlos Barriocanal 2008–2016
José Luis García 2016–2018
Jesús Martínez 2018–2020
Francisco Caselli 2020–Present

References

External links

Official website 
Futbolme.com profile 
BDFutbol profile
Unofficial website 

 
Football clubs in Castile and León
Sport in Burgos
Association football clubs established in 1985
1985 establishments in Spain
Segunda División clubs